Noor Hanim binti Ismail (born 5 October 1962) is a Malaysian politician and the former Selangor State Assemblywoman representing Seri Serdang from May 2013 to May 2018 for Malaysian Islamic Party (PAS) in the Pakatan Rakyat (PR) opposition coalition.

Election results 
'''Selangor State Legislative Assembly

References 

Living people
1962 births
People from Perak
Malaysian people of Malay descent
Malaysian Muslims
Malaysian Islamic Party politicians
Members of the Selangor State Legislative Assembly
Women MLAs in Selangor
21st-century Malaysian politicians
21st-century Malaysian women politicians